The Opaskwayak Cree Nation (OCN) Blizzard are a junior "A" ice hockey team from The Pas, Manitoba, Canada.  They are members of the Manitoba Junior Hockey League, a part of the Canadian Junior Hockey League and Hockey Canada.  The team is owned by two local businessmen and brothers Salman Safdar Dhillon and Usman Tahir Dhillon. Blizzard games are broadcast on local radio station CJAR 102.9 FM and can also be heard online at www.thepasonline.com.

History
The Blizzard were founded in 1996 by the Opaskwayak Cree Nation. The team was a year in the making with the Cree Nation's goal to enter the Saskatchewan Junior Hockey League (SJHL). Their hockey development and recreation department spent many months prior getting the community members on board through community meetings and house to house visits. Boh Kubrakovich, Jim Smith and Nathan McGillivary spent time working with the SJHL prior to entering their current league, the Manitoba Junior Hockey League (MJHL).

The Blizzard name and jersey was styled after the Utica Blizzard of the Colonial Hockey League.  It was through a Blizzard like snow storm that the new directors of the team made it to Winnipeg to announce the team. During the press conference the directors decided to call the team the Opaskwayak Blizzard.

Founding directors were James Smith, Chief Frances Flett, Gordon Lathlin, Gilbert Lathlin, Nathan McGillivary and recreation director/director of hockey Boh Kubrakovich. They selected Gardiner MacDougall as their first head coach and director of hockey. Leonard Strandberg was then hired as the general manager in 1996.

From the 1998–99 season until 2002–03, the Blizzard became the second team in MJHL history and the first team in over sixty years to win five straight Turnbull Cup titles as MJHL playoff champions. At the ANAVET Cup regional tournament, in succession, the Blizzard lost to the SJHL's Estevan Bruins in 1999, to the Battlefords North Stars in 2000, the Weyburn Red Wings in 2001, defeated the Kindersley Klippers in 2002, and then lost in 2003 to the Humboldt Broncos. By winning the ANAVET Cup in 2002 the Blizzard earned them the right to compete in the 2002 Royal Bank Cup. They finished the Junior A national championship round-robin with a 2–2 record. In the semi-final OCN defeated the British Columbia Hockey League's Chilliwack Chiefs 4–3. They would go on to lose in the national final to the Halifax Exports 3–1.

In December 2016, the Opaskwayak Cree Nation council declared its intention to cease team operations following the 2016–17 season. The Blizzard board of directors were later granted permission to operate the team for another season, but without funding from the band council.

In 2018 a pair of local businessmen jumped in to save the club. A proposal was presented in front of elected chief and council of Opaskwayak Cree Nation and it was unanimously approved and a sale agreement was signed. That sale was brought before the MJHL board of governors and after meeting a few more conditions was approved.

List of championships

Season-by-season record
Note: GP = Games Played, W = Wins, L = Losses, T = Ties, OTL = Overtime Losses, GF = Goals for, GA = Goals against

Playoffs
1997 Lost Final
OCN Blizzard defeated Portage Terriers 4-games-to-1
OCN Blizzard defeated Winkler Flyers 4-games-to-none
St. James Canadians defeated OCN Blizzard 4-games-to-1
1998 Lost Semi-final
OCN Blizzard defeated Portage Terriers 4-games-to-2
Winkler Flyers defeated OCN Blizzard 4-games-to-1
1999 Won League, Lost Anavet Cup
OCN Blizzard defeated Dauphin Kings 4-games-to-none
OCN Blizzard defeated Winkler Flyers 4-games-to-1
OCN Blizzard defeated Winnipeg South Blues 4-games-to-none MJHL CHAMPIONS
Estevan Bruins (SJHL) defeated OCN Blizzard 4-games-to-2
2000 Won League, Lost Anavet Cup
OCN Blizzard defeated Swan Valley Stampeders
OCN Blizzard defeated Dauphin Kings 4-games-to-none
OCN Blizzard defeated Winnipeg South Blues 4-games-to-1 MJHL CHAMPIONS
Battlefords North Stars (SJHL) defeated OCN Blizzard 4-games-to-1
2001 Won League, Lost Anavet Cup
OCN Blizzard defeated Swan Valley Stampeders 4-games-to-1
OCN Blizzard defeated Neepawa Natives 4-games-to-1
OCN Blizzard defeated Winkler Flyers 4-games-to-none MJHL CHAMPIONS
Weyburn Red Wings (SJHL) defeated OCN Blizzard 4-games-to-2
2002 Won League, Won Anavet Cup, Lost 2002 Royal Bank Cup final
OCN Blizzard defeated Swan Valley Stampeders 4-games-to-none
OCN Blizzard defeated Portage Terriers 4-games-to-3
OCN Blizzard defeated Winkler Flyers 4-games-to-none MJHL CHAMPIONS
OCN Blizzard defeated Kindersley Klippers (SJHL) 4-games-to-1 ANAVET CUP CHAMPIONS
Third in 2002 Royal Bank Cup round robin (2-2)
OCN Blizzard defeated Chilliwack Chiefs (BCHL) 4-3 in semi-final
Halifax Oland Exports (MJAHL) defeated OCN Blizzard 3-1 in final
2003 Won League, Lost Anavet Cup
OCN Blizzard defeated Dauphin Kings 4-games-to-none
OCN Blizzard defeated Portage Terriers 4-games-to-1
OCN Blizzard defeated Southeast Blades 4-games-to-none MJHL CHAMPIONS
Humboldt Broncos (SJHL) defeated OCN Blizzard 4-games-to-1
2004 Lost Quarter-final
Portage Terriers defeated OCN Blizzard 4-games-to-none
2005 Lost Quarter-final
Portage Terriers defeated OCN Blizzard 4-games-to-2
2006 Lost Final
OCN Blizzard defeated Swan Valley Stampeders 4-games-to-1
OCN Blizzard defeated Dauphin Kings 4-games-to-3
Winnipeg South Blues defeated OCN Blizzard 4-games-to-1

2009 Lost Quarter-final
Dauphin Kings defeated OCN Blizzard 4-games-to-2

2011 Lost Quarter-final
Dauphin Kings defeated OCN Blizzard 4-games-to-3
2012 Lost Semi-final
OCN Blizzard defeated Swan Valley Stampeders 4-games-to-2
Winnipeg Saints defeated OCN Blizzard 4-games-to-2
2013 Lost Semi-final
OCN Blizzard defeated Swan Valley Stampeders 4-games-to-1
Dauphin Kings defeated OCN Blizzard 4-games-to-3
2014 Lost Quarter-final
OCN Blizzard defeated Waywayseecappo Wolverines 2-games-to-1
Dauphin Kings defeated OCN Blizzard 4-games-to-0
2015 Lost Survivor Series
Selkirk Steelers defeated OCN Blizzard 2-games-to-0
2016 Lost Quarter-final
Winkler Flyers defeated OCN Blizzard 4-games-to-1
2017 Lost Final
OCN Blizzard defeated Winnipeg Blues 4-games-to-1
OCN Blizzard defeated Winkler Flyers 4-games-to-0
Portage Terriers defeated OCN Blizzard 4-games-to-2
2018 Lost Quarter-final
Winkler Flyers defeated OCN Blizzard 4-games-to-2
2019 DNQ
2020 DNQ
2021 Playoffs cancelled
2022 DNQ

Retired numbers
 #10 Gary Constant Jr.
 #18 Cliff Duschesne
 #22 Terence Tootoo

Notable alumni
Many players have used the OCN Blizzard as a stepping stone into a career in the professional leagues across Canada, the United States, and Europe.

See also 
List of ice hockey teams in Manitoba
Manitoba Junior Hockey League
Hockey Manitoba

References

External links
OCN Blizzard website

Manitoba Junior Hockey League teams
The Pas
Ice hockey clubs established in 1996
1996 establishments in Manitoba